Woombah is a civil Parish of Caira County New South Wales and a rural locality of Murray River Council.

References

Localities in New South Wales